The Makra is a peak in the Mansehra District in Hazara Region of the Himalayas in northern Pakistan. From Kiwai, a single 7-kilometre-long road runs uphill to Shogran, a tourist resort with numerous hotels; the track continues to climb up to Siri Lake and ends at Paye. From here it is a trek of four hours to the top of the Makra. Hiking on the Makra is difficult due to snow and the gradient of the mountainsides.

Although it can be straightforward to climb, fatalities have occurred during storms. In spite of its difficulties, the summit offers the good views of Hazara and Azad Kashmir. Fatalities tend to occur in bad weather, especially thick fog, and as a result of the steepness of some sections. The waters from the mountain's glacier feed the Kunhar River. The place has been named as Makra Peak by locals as Makra (means spider in Urdu, the local language) due to its shape in snow resembling that of a spider on a web.

See also 
 Malika Parbat
 Kaghan Valley

References

External links 
Makra Weather Forecast

Mountains of Khyber Pakhtunkhwa
Tourist attractions in Khyber Pakhtunkhwa
Four-thousanders of the Himalayas